Oumar Sissoko (born 13 September 1987) is a professional footballer who plays as a goalkeeper for Championnat National 2 club Racing Besançon. Born in France, he is a former Mali international. He made 26 appearances for the Mali national team between 2008 and 2017.

Club career
Sissoko was born in Montreuil, France. In the 2011–12 season he was given the number 1 jersey at Metz.

After a four-year spell in Metz, Sissoko signed a three-year contract with Ligue 1 side Ajaccio in June 2012. After the expiration of his contract, Ajaccio decided not to renew it; thus, he became a free agent.

On 2 August 2015, Sissoko signed for Orléans.

International career
Sissoko played twice for the Mali national team at the Africa Cup of Nations in 2012.

Personal life
His cousin Mohamed Sissoko is also a professional footballer and was also capped for Mali.

Career statistics

Club

International

See also
 Sub-Saharan African community of Paris

References

External links
 
 

1987 births
Living people
Malian footballers
French footballers
French people of Malian descent
Association football goalkeepers
Mali international footballers
2008 Africa Cup of Nations players
2010 Africa Cup of Nations players
2012 Africa Cup of Nations players
2017 Africa Cup of Nations players
INF Clairefontaine players
FC Metz players
AC Ajaccio players
US Orléans players
Le Havre AC players
ÉFC Fréjus Saint-Raphaël players
Racing Besançon players
Ligue 1 players
Ligue 2 players
Championnat National players
Championnat National 2 players
Championnat National 3 players
Sportspeople from Montreuil, Seine-Saint-Denis
Footballers from Seine-Saint-Denis